Siest is a commune in the Landes department in Nouvelle-Aquitaine in southwestern France.

Population

See also 
Communes of the Landes department

References 

Communes of Landes (department)